Riversimple is a United Kingdom-based car manufacturer of hydrogen-powered fuel cell electric vehicles (FCEVs). It is based in Llandrindod Wells, a town in Wales, where there is a research & development centre and the company's offices. Riversimple was founded by former motorsport engineer and racing driver Hugo Spowers.

History

Riversimple was founded by former motorsport engineer Hugo Spowers in 2001; it became Riversimple in 2007. Until 2014 the head office was in Ludlow, England. The offices were located at Dinham, by the River Teme, which gave the business its name.
Riversimple has a diverse team which includes those with F1, motor racing, yacht design, engineering and automotive design backgrounds. Riversimple has now relocated to Llandrindod Wells where it intends to build its first mass production facility.

Riversimple has developed three projects.

The Morgan LifeCar
The LIFECar was designed to be an R&D project.  Part-funded by the Technology Programme (now Innovate UK), this model ran in a test cell which proved beyond doubt that the technical proposition was viable.

The Hyrban Prototype
The Hyrban was a lab demonstrator designed to prove that a 6kW powertrain could produce the performance required for urban use and demonstrate the Network Electric Platform in a running vehicle. It was capable of 0-50mph in 8 secs and 50mph cruise.

Rasa Alpha
The Rasa is a further development of the Riversimple vehicle.  This model is robust as well as efficient and has been designed for regulations, safety, practicality and ease of use rather than as a powertrain demo.  It is designed for EC Whole Vehicle Type Approval (ECWVTA) and using methodical design processes and standards (ISO26262). The engineering prototype was on the roads in January 2016.

Rasa Beta
Refinements to the engineering prototype have been incorporated into every aspect of the new cars now in production in the new Riversimple workshop in Llandrindod Wells.  Safety-critical software, component packaging, air intake and energy management systems are all new.

Business model
The company produces their vehicles on a 'sale of service' model, under which users have use of a Riversimple vehicle for a monthly fee, which covers road tax, insurance, fuel and maintenance costs.

Riversimple state that they sell 'mobility as a service, not cars as a product' and that this approach incentivises them to make cars that last longer, use less resource and to maximise recovery at the end of the vehicle’s life.

Though the UK hydrogen refuelling infrastructure is in its infancy (with 13 UK refuelling stations as of February 2020) Riversimple’s model sees the company initially supplying their vehicles in the vicinity of hydrogen refuelling facilities. As of December 2018, several public and private sector organisations were signed up and over 3,000 individuals had expressed an interest in being customers.

The Riversimple company designs energy-efficient automobiles, including the Morgan LIFEcar and the Riversimple Urban Car. Several elements are considered during each design, including hydrogen fuel cell power sources, lightweight carbon fibre composite materials, open-source development and design, leasing instead of selling the cars, distributing manufacturing among many small manufacturing plants, and broad corporate ownership.

Rasa
Riversimple unveiled its working 'alpha' prototype, the two-seat Rasa (the name is derived from Tabula Rasa, which means 'clean slate' in Latin) on 17 February 2016. This was the culmination of 15 years of development of the concepts developed and espoused by Riversimple founder, Hugo Spowers, whose first FCEV design was the LIFECar, a research project developed by a consortium with Morgan, followed by a tech demonstrator urban vehicle.(Their first version was known as the Riversimple Urban Car).

The company’s 'beta' prototype, features several improvements over its predecessor, to drivetrain, wheels, interior equipment, headlights and aerodynamics. The 'beta' prototype also utilises a fully carbon fibre monocoque chassis.

The Rasa was designed by car designer Chris Reitz, who styled the new Fiat 500. The Rasa has a range of 300 miles on 1.5 kg of hydrogen, and achieves the equivalent of 250mpg with a top speed of 60 mph. Emissions are zero at tailpipe (just water vapour) and c.40gCO2/km Well-to-Wheel. Hydrogen refuelling for the Rasa takes three minutes.

The Rasa is powered by an 8.5 kW hydrogen fuel cell, and a regenerative braking system, which recovers up to 50% of the braking energy. The vehicle also uses a 1.9MJ lithium-ion hybrid capacitor set, providing additional power for acceleration. Electric motors in each wheel produce a combined 16 kW continuous power and 55 kW peak power.[7]

The Rasa is an open source vehicle. Riversimple cites the reason for this as wanting to work towards common goal of reducing environmental damage.

Beta testing
A€2m European FCHJU SWARM grant was utilised to support the development and build of 20 Riversimple Rasas, to install and commission a hydrogen fuelling station and to support the rollout of a 'clean mobility trial', in and around Abergavenny, in mid-Wales. A further £1.25m grant from the Office for Low Emission Vehicles' Hydrogen for Transport Programme, was awarded in February 2019.
The trial (in partnership with Monmouthshire County Council) will see over 200 testers, drawn from households, car clubs and businesses. It is estimated that each vehicle will generate on average 20Gb of data per day, during the trial.

References

External links
Official website

Car manufacturers of the United Kingdom
Open hardware vehicles
Llandrindod Wells
Electric vehicle manufacturers of the United Kingdom